Two total lunar eclipses occurred in 1957: 

 13 May 1957 lunar eclipse
 7 November 1957 lunar eclipse

See also 
 List of 20th-century lunar eclipses
 Lists of lunar eclipses